Lekgalameetse Provincial Park is a conserved mountain wilderness of 18,718 ha, situated west of Ofcolaco and Trichardtsdal in the northern Drakensberg of Limpopo Province, South Africa. It was envisaged by the Lebowa government during the 1980s as a 25,000 ha reserve called The Downs Nature Reserve, which would cater recreational activities, camping and hiking. Current amenities include self-catering accommodation, a bush camp with log cabins beside a stream, farmhouses serving as guest houses, and a camp for school outings.

Since 2001 it is managed by the Limpopo Tourism and Parks Board. In the north it is contiguous with the Wolkberg Wilderness Area. The conservation area is traversed from west to east by the Orrie Baragwanath Pass, which is however only suitable for four-wheel drive vehicles. The western slopes are drained by tributaries of the Mohlapitse River which originates in the Wolkberg, and joins the Olifants River some kilometers to the south. Lekgalameetse  means "the place of water" in the sePedi language of the Sekororo people, a tribe of the baPedi.

The area has a varied butterfly fauna. Since the mid 1980s the invasive and wind dispersed pompom weed has established itself here.

References

Limpopo Provincial Parks